The Fiorano Circuit is a private racetrack owned by Ferrari for development and testing purposes. It is located in Fiorano Modenese, near the Italian town of Maranello. The circuit has FIA Grade 1 license.

Thus Ferrari is able to simulate corner and track types of other Grand Prix circuits. As with Suzuka, it is a figure-eight course.

The track is equipped with telemetry sensors and a large skidpad for tyre testing. In 2001 an irrigation system using rain collected in eight cisterns was installed to simulate wet track conditions. When Scuderia Ferrari are testing a F1 car at the track, it is common to see Tifosi watching the test from the roadside, which is the closest point from which the track is viewable to the public.

Ferrari customers are allowed to test drive new cars at the Fiorano circuit.  The Ferrari 599 GTB Fiorano is named after this track, as well as the Assetto Fiorano track package of the Ferrari SF90 Stradale and the Ferrari 296 GTB.

In the 16 years from the time the track opened until his death in 1988, Enzo Ferrari would either sit in his house which was located at the circuit and listen to, or sit track side and watch his beloved scarlet Formula One cars testing. Legend has it that this was the real reason that the "old man" had the circuit built, so he could enjoy his cars and his drivers without the presence of other F1 cars or the press. In reality Ferrari made the decision of building his own testing track when he realised that the Modena Autodrome could no longer serve this purpose.

Fiorano Circuit record lap times

Fiorano in video games

References

External links 

 Circuito di Fiorano – from Comune di Fiorano Modenese
 ApocalX maps, via Google Earth
 Satellite picture by Google Maps

Ferrari
Motorsport venues in Italy
Road test tracks by manufacturer